OTR or Otr may refer to:

Science and technology
 Off-the-Record Messaging, an instant messaging encryption protocol
 Oxygen transmission rate, of a substance
 × Otaara, a plant genus

Medicine 
 Ocular tilt reaction, a form of skew deviation

Entertainment
 Old-time radio, a broadcasting era
 Off the Record with Michael Landsberg, a sports talk show

Music
 Otierre, an Italian hip hop band

Other uses
 Coto 47 Airport, in Costa Rica
 Occupational Therapist, Registered, Licensed
 On the Run (convenience store)#Australia
 Ótr, a mythical dwarf
 Over-the-Rhine, a neighborhood in Cincinnati, Ohio, US
 Over the road, truck drivers without schedule or route